Maurice Linguist (born April 1, 1984) is an American football coach. He is the head football coach at the University at Buffalo, a position he had held since 2021.

Playing career
A native of Mesquite, Texas, Linguist played at Mesquite High School for the 2001 state champs and college football as a defensive back for Baylor. As a senior, he was an honorable mention on the All-Big 12 Team. He received a bachelor's degree in communication and a master's degree in sports management at Baylor.

Coaching career

Assistant coaching jobs
After playing at Baylor, Linguist spent a season as a graduate assistant with the Bears. The following year, he coached defensive backs and special teams at Valdosta State. From 2009 until 2011, he coached safeties at James Madison.

In 2012, he joined the coaching staff at Buffalo for the first time as a defensive backs coach. In 2013, he was the team's co-defensive coordinator as well as its recruiting coordinator.

In 2014, he was hired to coach the secondary at Iowa State. In 2016, he was hired as the safeties coach at Mississippi State. Linguist spent the 2017 season coaching defensive backs at Minnesota. Following the season, he was named an assistant head coach to P. J. Fleck. However, less than a month later, in January 2018, he left the Golden Gophers to join the coaching staff at Texas A&M.

After serving for two years as the cornerbacks coach at Texas A&M, Mike McCarthy hired him as the secondary coach of the Dallas Cowboys, his first job in the National Football League.

Buffalo
Following the 2020 NFL season, Linguist was hired as the co-defensive coordinator at the University of Michigan. However, on May 7, 2021, he was hired as the head coach at the University at Buffalo. Despite Buffalo's poor performance in 2021, Linguist's recruiting class for 2022 was described by Sports Illustrated as the second-best in the Mid-American Conference. In July 2022, he signed a one-year contract extension. In his second season as head coach, Linguist led the Bulls to a 6–6 record in the regular season, earning an invite to the 2022 Camellia Bowl.

Head coaching record

References

External links
 Buffalo profile

1984 births
Living people
American football safeties
Baylor Bears football coaches
Baylor Bears football players
Buffalo Bulls football coaches
Dallas Cowboys coaches
Iowa State Cyclones football coaches
James Madison Dukes football coaches
Minnesota Golden Gophers football coaches
Mississippi State Bulldogs football coaches
Texas A&M Aggies football coaches
Valdosta State Blazers football coaches
Coaches of American football from Texas
Players of American football from Dallas
African-American coaches of American football
African-American players of American football
21st-century African-American sportspeople